Pearse McAuley (born  in Strabane) is a former Provisional IRA member, who escaped from Brixton Prison in London on 7 July 1991 along with his cellmate Nessan Quinlivan, while awaiting trial on charges relating to a suspected plot to assassinate former brewery company chairman, Sir Charles Tidbury.

McAuley fled to Ireland, where he was granted bail while contesting extradition to Britain.

Manslaughter conviction
In 1999 McAuley was convicted of manslaughter in Dublin's Special Criminal Court for his role in the killing of Detective Garda Jerry McCabe in the course of an armed robbery. He was sentenced to 14 years in prison.

He was released from prison in August 2009, having served ten-and-a-half years of his sentence. The Crown Prosecution Service announced it would not seek his extradition on charges related to the Brixton escape. His release prompted adverse commentary in the Irish press, with McAuley being described as a "psychopathic gun nut".

Marriage and separation
In 2003 he married Pauline Tully, a Sinn Féin councillor on Cavan County Council and was granted day release from prison to attend the wedding.  The couple had two sons, and separated in February 2014.

Conviction for stabbing wife
On Christmas Eve, 2014, McAuley was arrested for stabbing his estranged wife multiple times in front of their two children. He was found guilty on 28 November 2015, and on 2 December 2015 was sentenced to 12 years' imprisonment, the final four suspended.

In her victim impact statement Ms Tully said "I am in absolute fear of him and fear that someday he will make another attempt on my life. I do not ever expect to enjoy a peaceful mind, but will live a life haunted by what happened to me."

He was released from prison on 24 June 2022.

References

Escapees from England and Wales detention
Irish escapees
Irish people convicted of manslaughter
Irish republicans
Living people
Provisional Irish Republican Army members
Republicans imprisoned during the Northern Ireland conflict
Year of birth uncertain
1960s births
People convicted of domestic violence